Blix Street Records is a United States-based record label located in Gig Harbor, Washington, overseen by president Bill Straw. Blix Street features a diverse group of instrumental, vocal, and Celtic albums. Among the more famous artists who have recorded with Blix Street Records are Eva Cassidy, Mary Black, Grace Griffith, Daniel Rodriguez, Dougie Maclean, Davy Knowles, Back Door Slam, and songwriter Randy Sharp.

References

External links
 Official Website

American record labels
Companies based in Pierce County, Washington
Gig Harbor, Washington